Montague Road is an east-west route across the suburbs of Adelaide, about  north of the city centre. It connects Port Wakefield Road at Cavan across Main North Road at Pooraka to North East Road at Modbury.

Major intersections

References

Roads in Adelaide